Jaime José Fillol Durán (born 3 June 1946), known professionally as Jaime Fillol Sr., is a retired professional tennis player from Chile, who played in the 1960s, 1970s and 1980s.

Fillol was ranked as high as world No. 14 in singles on the ATP rankings (achieving that ranking on 2 March 1974) and No. 82 in doubles (2 January 1984).

In the Open era (after 1968), Fillol won 6 singles titles and 16 doubles titles. In addition he was a founding member and one of the first ATP Presidents. As President of the ATP, Fillol had a passion to create the first pension plan of the ATP and thus it was named after him. Fillol is also a member of the University of Miami "Hall of Fame" where he graduated in 1969.

He competed at the 1973 Davis Cup with Patricio Cornejo where he played the longest Davis Cup rubber in terms of games, eventually losing to Americans Stan Smith and Erik van Dillen, winning the first set 9–7, the next 39–37, but lost the next three sets, 6–8, 1–6, 3–6 in the 1973 American Zone Final. The second set is the world record for the most games in a Davis Cup set.

He was also a member of the 1975 Davis Cup team, which advanced to the semifinals, and the 1976 Davis Cup team, which made it all the way to the final, losing to Italy.

He is the older brother of tennis player Álvaro Fillol, and the grandfather of tennis player Nicolás Jarry.

Career finals

Singles: 24 (9 titles, 15 runner-ups)

Doubles open era (16 titles, 14 runner-ups)

Mixed doubles (1 title, 1 runner-up)

References

External links
 
 
 

1946 births
Living people
Chilean male tennis players
Tennis players from Santiago
Chilean people of Catalan descent
Chilean people of Asturian descent